Adams County Christian School is a private Christian school serving grades K-12 in West Union, Ohio, United States.  It was founded in 1981.

References

External links

High schools in Adams County, Ohio
Private K-12 schools in Ohio
Christian schools in Ohio